Wolica  is a village in the administrative district of Gmina Hrubieszów, within Hrubieszów County, Lublin Voivodeship, in eastern Poland, close to the border with Ukraine.

In 2005 the village has a population of 270.

References
Gmina Hrubieszów official website

Villages in Hrubieszów County